The 16th (Irish) Division was an infantry division of the British Army, raised for service during World War I. The division was a voluntary 'Service' formation of Lord Kitchener's New Armies, created in Ireland from the 'National Volunteers', initially in September 1914, after the outbreak of the Great War. In December 1915, the division moved to France, joining the British Expeditionary Force (BEF), under the command of Irish Major General William Hickie, and spent the duration of the war in action on the Western Front. Following enormous losses at the Somme, Passchendaele and Ypres, the 16th (Irish) Division required a substantial refit in England between June and August 1918, which involved the introduction of many non-Irish battalions.

History

Moved by the fate of Belgium, a small and Catholic country, John Redmond had called on Irishmen to enlist "in defence of the highest principles of religion and morality and right". More Catholic Irish enlisted than Protestants.

The 16th Division began forming as part of the K2 Army Group towards the end of 1914 after Irish recruits in the early days of the war from England and Belfast first filled the ranks of the 10th (Irish) Division before being assigned to the 16th Division, formed around a core of National Volunteers. Initial training began in Ireland at Fermoy, Munster; recruits also trained at Buttevant. The division moved to Aldershot in Hampshire, England for more intensive training in September 1915. After thirteen weeks, the division was deployed to Étaples in France, joining the British Expeditionary Force (BEF), then commanded by Field Marshal Sir John French, but later replaced by General Sir Douglas Haig. From there the division left on 18 December for that part of the front in the Loos salient, under the command of Irish Major General William Hickie and spent the rest of the war on the Western Front.

Until March 1916 the 16th Division was part of IV Corps, commanded by the staunch unionist, Lieutenant General Sir Henry Wilson. Wilson, who had called the division "Johnnie Redmond's pets", inspected them over the course of a few days over Christmas 1915, noting that they "appear to be inferior" and that "at least 50p.c. are quite useless, old whiskey-sodden militiamen". Hickie agreed that he had "a political Divn of riff raff Redmondites". Wilson thought the 47th Brigade had "old officers, old & useless men, very bad musketry, rotten boots, and altogether a very poor show". Wilson reported to the Army Commander, Lieutenant General Sir Charles Monro (6 January) that the division, despite having been training since September–October 1914, would not be fit to serve in an active part of the line for six weeks. Although–in the opinion of Wilson's biographer Keith Jeffery–political prejudice probably played a part in these views, Wilson also attributed much of the difference in quality between his divisions to training, especially of officers, in which he took a keen personal interest, opposing Haig's wish to delegate training from corps to division level. Hickie was–in public–much more diplomatic and tactful and spoke of the pride which his new command gave him.

At Loos, in January and February 1916, the division was introduced to trench warfare and suffered greatly in the Battle of Hulluch. Personnel raided German trenches all through May and June. In late July they were moved to the Somme Valley where they were intensively engaged in the Battle of the Somme. Lieutenant General Hubert Gough, the British Fifth Army commander, had asked, at the end of 1915, for the division to be placed under his command, and had established the first corps school for the training of young officers. The 16th Division played an important part in capturing the towns of Guillemont and Ginchy, although they suffered massive casualties. During these successful actions between 1 and 10 September casualties amounted to 224 officers and 4,090 men; despite these very heavy losses the division gained a reputation as first-class shock troops. Out of a total of 10,845 men, it had lost 3,491 on the Loos sector between January and the end of May 1916, including heavy casualties from bombardment and a gas attack at Hullach in April. Bloodletting of this order was fatal to the division's character, for it had to be made good by drafts from England.

In early 1917, the division took a major part in the Battle of Messines alongside the 36th (Ulster) Division, adding to both their recognition and reputation. Their major actions ended in the summer of 1917 at the Battle of Passchendaele after, again, coming under the command of Gough and the Fifth Army. In July 1917, during the Third Battle of Ypres, although both divisions were completely exhausted after 13 days of moving weighty equipment under heavy shelling, Gough ordered the battalions to advance through deep mud towards well fortified German positions left untouched by totally inadequate artillery preparation. By mid August, the 16th had suffered over 4,200 casualties, the 36th almost 3,600, or more than 50% of their numbers. Haig, now a field marshal, was very critical of Gough for "playing the Irish card".

The 16th Division held an exposed position from early 1918 at Ronssoy where they suffered more heavy losses during the German Army's Spring Offensive in March and being practically wiped out in the retreat which followed Operation Michael. Haig wrote in his diary (22 March 1918) that the division was "said not to be so full of fight as the others. In fact, certain Irish units did very badly and gave way immediately the enemy showed". In fact the division's casualties were the highest of any BEF division at this time, and records of the German 18th and 50th Reserve Divisions show that the Irish fought hard. The corps commander, Lieutenant General Walter Congreve, wrote "the real truth is that their reserve brigade did not fight at all and their right brigade very indifferently". One battalion was greeted at the rear with cries of "There go the Sinn Feiners!" A report by Field Marshal Sir Henry Wilson, now the Chief of the Imperial General Staff (CIGS), concluded that there was no evidence that the men had not fought well, but pointed out that only two-thirds of the men were of Irish birth. The matter affected the debate over the introduction of conscription of Ireland.

The remnants of the division were later transferred to XIX Corps of the Third Army. The 16th helped to finally halt the German attack prior to the Battle of Hamel. The decision was then made to break up the division, the three surviving Service battalions were posted to other formations.

On 14 June the division returned to England for reconstitution. The Conscription Crisis of 1918 in Ireland meant that fewer Irish recruits could be raised so that the 16th Division which returned to France on 27 July contained five English battalions, two Scottish battalions and one Welsh battalion. The only original battalion left was the 5th Royal Irish Fusiliers.

The dispersion of the Irish battalions throughout the BEF in 1918, despite its practical considerations, appears to suggest that the Irish units were increasingly distrusted by the military authorities.

Order of battle

The 16th Division was composed of the following during World War I:

47th Brigade
 8th (Service) Battalion, Royal Munster Fusiliers (New Army) (disbanded 23 November 1916)
 6th (Service) Battalion, Royal Irish Regiment (disbanded 9 February 1918)
 7th (Service) Battalion, Prince of Wales's Leinster Regiment (Royal Canadians); (disbanded 31 July 1922)
 6th (Service) Battalion, Connaught Rangers (left June 1918)
 1st Battalion, Royal Munster Fusiliers (joined 22 November 1916 left 20 April 1918)
 2nd Battalion, Leinster Regiment (joined 2 February 1918 left 23 April 1918)
 18th (Service) Battalion Welsh Regiment (2nd Glamorgan), (joined May 1918)
 14th (Service) Battalion, Leicestershire Regiment (joined 26 June 1918)
 9th (Service) Battalion, Black Watch (Royal Highlanders) (joined 2 July 1918)
 47th Machine Gun Company, Machine Gun Corps (M.G.C.) (joined 28 April 1916, moved to 16th Battalion, M.G.C. 9 March 1918)
47th Trench Mortar Battery (formed by 16 June 1916, reformed in England 1918)

The 47th Brigade was known as the "Nationalist Brigade" as the majority were men from Redmond's Irish Volunteers.

48th Brigade
 9th (Service) Battalion, Royal Munster Fusiliers (New Army) (disbanded 30 May 1916)
 7th (Service) Battalion, Royal Irish Rifles (left 23 August 1917)
 8th (Service) Battalion, Royal Dublin Fusiliers (merged with 9th Battalion 24 October 1917 renamed 8th/9th Battalion, disbanded 10 February 1918)
 9th (Service) Battalion, Royal Dublin Fusiliers (merged with 8th Battalion 24 October 1917)
 1st Battalion, Royal Munster Fusiliers (joined 28 May 1916 left 22 November 1916)
 10th (Service) Battalion, Royal Dublin Fusiliers (joined 23 June 1917, left 13 February 1918)
 1st Battalion, Royal Dublin Fusiliers (joined 19 October 1917 left 26 April 1918)
 2nd Battalion, Royal Munster Fusiliers (joined 3 February 1918 left 19 May 1918)
 22nd (Service) Battalion, Northumberland Fusiliers (joined 2 June 1918)
 11th (Service) Battalion, Royal Irish Fusiliers (joined 2 June 1918 left August 1918)
 18th (Service) Battalion, Cameronians (Scottish Rifles) (joined 2 July 1918)
 5th (Service) Battalion, Royal Irish Fusiliers (joined 24 August 1918)
 48th Machine Gun Company (joined 28 April 1916, moved to 16th Battalion, M.G.C. 9 March 1918)
48th Trench Mortar Battery (formed by 24 June 1916, reformed in England 1918)

49th Brigade
 7th (Service) Battalion, Royal Irish Fusiliers (merged with 8th Battalion 15 October 1916, renamed as 7th/8th Battalion, disbanded February 1918)
 8th (Service) Battalion, Royal Irish Fusiliers (merged with 7th Battalion 15 October 1916)
 7th (Service) Battalion, Royal Inniskilling Fusiliers (merged with 8th Battalion 23 August 1917, renamed as 7th/8th Battalion, left 17 June 1918)
 8th (Service) Battalion, Royal Inniskilling Fusiliers (merged with 7th Battalion 23 August 1917)
 2nd Battalion, Royal Irish Regiment (joined 14 October 1916 left 23 April 1918)
 7th (Service) Battalion, Royal Irish Regiment (South Irish Horse) Battalion,(joined 17 October 1917 left 17 July 1918)
 34th (Service) Battalion, London Regiment (County of London) Battalion (joined 27 June 1918)
 18th (Service) Battalion, Gloucestershire Regiment (joined 2 July 1918)
 6th (Service) Battalion, Prince Albert's (Somerset Light Infantry)- (joined 4 July 1918)
 49th Machine Gun Company, Machine Gun Corps (joined 29 April 1916, moved to 16th Battalion, M.G.C 9 March 1918)
49th Trench Mortar Battery (formed by 16 June 1916, reformed in England 1918)

Divisional troops
11th (Service) Battalion, Hampshire Regiment (joined 20 September 1914 as divisional pioneers)
269th Machine Gun Company M.G.C. (joined 18 January 1918, moved to 16th Battalion M.G.C. 9 March 1918)
16th Machine Gun Battalion M.G.C. (formed 9 March 1918, broken up 8 May 1918. A new 16th MG Battalion joined on 2 August 1918)
19th Entrenching Battalion (joined 4 April 1918, disbanded 5 May 1918. Troops went to 2nd Royal Munster Fusiliers)
Divisional Mounted Troops	
16th Divisional Cyclist Company Army Cyclist Corps (joined 11 December 1914, disbanded 1 June 1916.)
C Squadron, South Irish Horse (joined January 1915, left 17 May 1916)
16th Divisional Train Army Service Corps
142nd, 143rd, 144th and 145th Companies
217th Divisional Employment Company (formed by 30 June 1917)
47th Mobile Veterinary Section Army Veterinary Corps

Royal Artillery
LXXIV Brigade Royal Field Artillery (R.F.A.) (left in July 1915 to join Guards Division)
LXXV Brigade R.F.A. (as for LXXIV Brigade)
LXXVI Brigade R.F.A. (as for LXXIV Brigade)
LXXVII (H) Brigade R.F.A. (left in July 1915 but rejoined 22 February 1916, left 22 February 1917)
CLXXVII Brigade R.F.A. (joined 22 February 1916)
CLXXX Brigade R.F.A. (joined 22 February 1916)
CLXXXII Brigade R.F.A. (joined 22 February 1916, broken up 27 August 1916)
16th Divisional Ammunition Column R.F.A. (left in August 1915 to join Guards Division. Replaced 22 February 1916)
16th Heavy Battery Royal Garrison Artillery (raised for the Division but moved independently to France in July 1915)
X.16, Y.16 and Z.16 Medium Trench Mortar Batteries R.F.A. (joined by June 1916. Z.16 broken up 27 February 1918. X.16 and Y.16 broken up 20 April 1918)
V.16 Heavy Trench Mortar Battery R.F.A. (joined 5 September 1916, left February 1918)

Royal Engineers
75th Field Company (left 13 August 1915 to join Guards Division)
76th Field Company (left 13 August 1915 to join Guards Division)
16th Divisional Signal (left 13 August 1915 to join Guards Division, a new Company joined in September 1915)
95th Field Company (joined 30 January 1915 from 26th Division, left 17 August 1915 to join 7th Division)
155th Field Company (joined August 1915)
156th Field Company (joined August 1915)
157th Field Company (joined August 1915)

Royal Army Medical Corps
48th Field Ambulance (left June 1915 and joined 37th Division)
49th Field Ambulance (as for 48th Coy.)
50th Field Ambulance (as for 48th Coy.)
111th Field Ambulance (joined September 1915)
112th Field Ambulance (joined September 1915)
113th Field Ambulance (joined September 1915)
81st Sanitary Section (joined before embarkation, left for IX Corps in April 1917)

General officers commanding
The following officers commanded the division at various times:

See also

 List of British divisions in World War I
 10th (Irish) Division
 36th (Ulster) Division

Notes

Battles
 Battle of Hulluch
 Battle of the Somme (1916)
 Battle of Guillemont
 Battle of Ginchy
 Battle of Messines (1917)
 Third Battle of Ypres

Great War Memorials

 Irish National War Memorial Gardens, Dublin.
 Island of Ireland Peace Park Messines, Belgium.
 Ulster Tower Memorial Thiepval, France.
 Menin Gate Memorial Ypres, Belgium.

References and further reading 
  Bartlet, Thomas & Jeffery, Keith: A Military History of Ireland, Cambridge University Press (1996) (2006), 
  Bowen, Desmond & Jean:  Heroic Option: The Irish in the British Army, Pen & Sword Books (2005), .
  Cooper, Bryan (1918):  The 10th (Irish) Division in Gallipoli, Irish Academic Press (1993), (2003). .
  Denman, Terence:  Ireland's Unknown Soldiers: the 16th (Irish) Division in the Great War, Irish Academic Press (1992), (2003) .
  Dooley, Thomas P.:  Irishmen or English Soldiers? : the Times of a Southern Catholic Irish Man (1876–1916), Liverpool Press (1995), .
  Dungan, Myles: They Shall not Grow Old: Irish Soldiers in the Great War, Four Courts Press (1997), .
 
  Grayson, Dr. Richard S.: Belfast Boys – How Unionists and Nationalists fought and died together in the First World War, Continuum UK, London (2009) 
  Horne, John ed.: Our War 'Ireland and the Great War''': The Thomas Davis Lectures, The Royal Irish Academy, Dublin (2008) 
  Jeffrey, Keith: Ireland and the Great War, Press Syndicate of the University of Cambridge (2000), .
 

  Moore, Steven:  The Irish on the Somme (2005), .
  Murphy, David: Irish Regiments in the World Wars, Osprey Publishing (2007), 
  Murphy, David: The Irish Brigades, 1685–2006, A gazetteer of Irish Military Service past and present, Four Courts Press (2007) The Military Heritage of Ireland Trust. 
  Prior, Robin & Wilson, Trevor. (1997). Passchendaele: The Untold Story. Yale University Press.
 Maxwell Staniforth, At war with the 16th Irish Division 1914-1918 : the Staniforth letters  Walker, Stephen: Forgotten Soldiers; The Irishmen shot at dawn'' Gill & Nacmillan (2007),

External links
 The Long, Long Trail: The 16th (Irish) Division in 1914-1918
 A website with information relating to the Royal Dublin Fusiliers who had battalions which were a part of the 16th (Irish) Division.
 The Long, Long Trail: Information relating to the Royal Munster Fusiliers (New Army) which was part of the 16th (Irish) Division
 The Battle for Messines Ridge
 Homepage of the Island of Ireland Peace Park Memorial
 The Irish War Memorials Project – listing of monuments throughout Ireland
 The Military Heritage of Ireland Trust
 Department of the Taoiseach: Irish Soldiers in the First World War

Infantry divisions of the British Army in World War I
Kitchener's Army divisions
Military units and formations established in 1914
Ireland in World War I
1914 establishments in the United Kingdom
Military units and formations disestablished in 1919
1919 disestablishments in the United Kingdom